The vesical veins are veins in the pelvis that drain blood from the urinary bladder. The vesical veins receive blood from the vesical venous plexus and are tributaries of the internal iliac veins.

References

External links
 Venous drainage of the urinary bladder

Veins of the torso